Liugoulong station is a subway interchange station in Changsha, Hunan, China, operated by the Changsha subway operator Changsha Metro.

Station layout
The station has one island platform.

History
The station was completed in August 2017. The station opened on 26 May 2019. It later became an interchange on June 28, 2022 after the opening of Line 6.

Surrounding area
 Hunan University of Traditional Chinese Medicine
 Xiangya Third Hospital of Central South University
 Xiangya School of Medicine, Central South University
 Zhonglian Science Park
 Binjiang School
 Yuelu District Children's Palace

References

Railway stations in Hunan
Railway stations in China  opened in 2019